The 1997–98 NBA season was the tenth season for the Miami Heat in the National Basketball Association. In the off-season, the Heat signed free agents Eric Murdock and Terry Mills, and acquired Duane Causwell from the Sacramento Kings. Despite Alonzo Mourning missing the first 22 games of the season due to an off-season knee injury, and Jamal Mashburn only playing just 48 games due to a thumb injury, the Heat continued to play strong basketball as backup center Isaac Austin played strong coming off the bench. Mourning would eventually return as Austin was traded at midseason to the Los Angeles Clippers in exchange for Brent Barry, as the Heat posted a 13–2 record in February, including a ten-game winning streak between February and March, and holding a 30–17 record at the All-Star break. The Heat finished first place in the Atlantic Division with a 55–27 record.

Tim Hardaway averaged 18.9 points, 8.3 assists and 1.7 steals per game, and was named to the All-NBA Second Team, and selected for the 1998 NBA All-Star Game, while Mourning averaged 19.2 points, 9.6 rebounds and 2.2 blocks per game, and Mashburn provided the team with 15.1 points per game. In addition, Voshon Lenard contributed 12.3 points per game, while P.J. Brown provided with 9.6 points, 8.6 rebounds and 1.3 blocks per game, and three-point specialist Dan Majerle contributed 7.2 points per game. Hardaway also finished in sixth place in Most Valuable Player voting. The Heat had the sixth best team defensive rating in the NBA.

In the Eastern Conference First Round of the playoffs, the Heat faced the 7th-seeded New York Knicks. Despite losing Majerle to a groin injury in Game 2, the Heat would take a 2–1 lead in the series. However, in Game 4, Mourning and Knicks forward Larry Johnson, both former teammates on the Charlotte Hornets, got into a brawl in the closing seconds as the Knicks won the game, 90–85 to even the series at two games a piece; Mourning and Johnson were both suspended for two games. Without Mourning, the Heat would lose Game 5 at the Miami Arena, 98–81.

Following the season, Barry, who did not play in the playoffs due to an ankle injury after playing 17 games with the Heat, signed as a free agent with the Chicago Bulls, and Murdock signed with the New Jersey Nets.

Offseason

Draft picks

Roster

Regular season

Season standings

Record vs. opponents

Playoffs

|- align="center" bgcolor="#ccffcc"
| 1
| April 24
| New York
| W 94–79
| Tim Hardaway (34)
| P. J. Brown (10)
| Eric Murdock (5)
| Miami Arena15,200
| 1–0
|- align="center" bgcolor="#ffcccc"
| 2
| April 26
| New York
| L 86–96
| Alonzo Mourning (30)
| Alonzo Mourning (13)
| Tim Hardaway (7)
| Miami Arena15,200
| 1–1
|- align="center" bgcolor="#ccffcc"
| 3
| April 28
| @ New York
| W 91–85
| Voshon Lenard (28)
| Alonzo Mourning (9)
| Tim Hardaway (7)
| Madison Square Garden19,763
| 2–1
|- align="center" bgcolor="#ffcccc"
| 4
| April 30
| @ New York
| L 85–90
| Tim Hardaway (33)
| P. J. Brown (9)
| Tim Hardaway (9)
| Madison Square Garden19,763
| 2–2
|- align="center" bgcolor="#ffcccc"
| 5
| May 3
| New York
| L 81–98
| Tim Hardaway (21)
| P. J. Brown (10)
| Tim Hardaway (8)
| Miami Arena15,200
| 2–3
|-

Player statistics

NOTE: Please write the players statistics in alphabetical order by last name.

Season

Playoffs

Awards and records
 Tim Hardaway, All-NBA Second Team

Transactions

References

 1997-98 Miami Heat

Miami Heat seasons
Miami Heat
Miami Heat
Miami Heat